Chu and Blossom is a 2014 American comedy-drama film directed by Charles Chu and Gavin Kelly and starring Chu, Ryan O'Nan, Caitlin Stasey, Alan Cumming, Richard Kind, Melanie Lynskey, Chris Marquette, Annie Potts and Mercedes Ruehl.

Cast
Charles Chu as Joon Chu
Ryan O'Nan as Butch Blossom
Caitlin Stasey as Cherry Swade
Alan Cumming as Uncle Jackie
Richard Kind as Fred
Melanie Lynskey as Miss Shoemaker
Chris Marquette as Steve
Annie Potts as Aunt Harley
Mercedes Ruehl as Mrs. Fefterg

Production
The film was shot in Tampa Bay, Plant City, Florida, Lakeland, Florida, Marion County, Florida and Ocala, Florida.

Release
The film premiered at the Gasparilla International Film Festival on March 23, 2014.

Reception
Justin Lowe of The Hollywood Reporter gave the film a negative review and wrote, "A big-name supporting cast isn’t enough to rescue this struggling comedy."

References

External links
 
 

2010s English-language films